Thor Island is one of the Canadian arctic islands in Nunavut, Canada. It lies south of Ellef Ringnes Island.

External links
 Thor Island in the Atlas of Canada - Toporama; Natural Resources Canada

Islands of the Queen Elizabeth Islands
Uninhabited islands of Qikiqtaaluk Region